Tarkan is a 1999 compilation album by Tarkan, composed of songs released in his 1994 A-Acayipsin and 1997 Ölürüm Sana albums. It was initially released in France in 1998 but due to the success of his single "Şımarık", it was given a wider European release on 1 April 1999, with 14 tracks. Due to its popularity it was re-released with 15 tracks on 27 September in the same year. The sales of this album won Tarkan a Monaco World Music Award.

Track listing

Extra information
The Japanese export had two bonus tracks, "Bu Gece" (Kir Zincirlerini) Club Remix and "Şımarık" (Malagutti Remix).

Music videos
 "Şıkıdım"
 "Şımarık"
 "Bu Gece"

Charts

Year-end charts

Sales

Notes

External links
 Tarkan Tevetoğlu - Tarkan Lyric TR
 Tarkan Translations
 Album and Song Lyrics Information in English

Tarkan (singer) albums
1999 compilation albums